Zafar Beg Bhittani is a Pakistani politician who had been a member of the National Assembly of Pakistan from 2008 to 2013.

Political career
He was elected to the National Assembly of Pakistan from Constituency NA-47 (Tribal Area-XII) as an independent candidate in 2008 Pakistani general election. He received 21,426 votes and defeated an independent candidate,  Nasim Afridi.

He ran for the seat of the National Assembly from Constituency NA-47 (Tribal Area-XII) as an independent candidate in 2013 Pakistani general election but was unsuccessful. He received 28 votes and lost the seat to Qaiser Jamal.

References

Pakistani MNAs 2008–2013
Living people
People from Khyber Pakhtunkhwa
Year of birth missing (living people)